The Blade of Blackpoole is a 1982 adventure game written by Tim Wilson and published by Sirius Software.

Gameplay
The Blade of Blackpoole is a game in which the player must recover and return the stolen magical sword Myraglym.

Reception
Computer Gaming World reviewed the game and stated that "A perfect score is 500 and your score is displayed as a ratio of this 500. The less moves it takes you to complete the quest the higher the score. This adds much to the game's potential life span."

Reviews
Electronic Fun with Computers & Games - Sep, 1983
Computer and Video Games (Jul, 1983)

References

External links
1984 Software Encyclopedia from Electronic Games
Addison Wesley Book of Atari Software 1984
Review in Ahoy!
Review in Compute!'s Guide to Adventure Games
Review in InCider
Review in Page 6
Review in TeleMatch (German)
Entry in The Book of Adventure Games

1982 video games
Adventure games
Apple II games
Atari 8-bit family games
Fantasy video games
FM-7 games
NEC PC-8801 games
NEC PC-9801 games
Sirius Software games
Video games developed in the United States